Belén is one of 11 districts of the Sucre Province in the Ayacucho region in Peru.

History 
Belén District was created by Law No.15231 in Nov 23, 1964, during first term of President Fernando Belaúnde

Administrative division
The populated places in the district are:
 Belen
 Socos
 Cochayocc
 Cuije

Population
The population of  Belén is 611 people, 292 men and 319 women.

Ethnic groups 
The people in the district are mainly indigenous citizens of Quechua descent. Quechua is the language which the majority of the population (79.32%) learnt to speak in childhood, 20.52% of the residents started speaking using the Spanish language (2007 Peru Census).

Authorities

Mayors 
 2011-2014: Julián Elías Cárdenas Pérez.
 2007-2010: José Luis Romero Sheron.

Festivities

See also 
 Subdivisions of Peru

References

External links